The Shura Council of Mujahideen in Derna was a coalition of Islamist militias that advocated the implementation of Sharia law within Derna, Libya. Besides seeking to implement strict social mores in Derna, the alliance was known for its open opposition to Khalifa Haftar and the Libyan affiliates of the Islamic State of Iraq and the Levant (ISIL).

On 11 May 2018, the Shura Council was dissolved as result of reversals during the Battle of Derna (2018), and replaced by the Derna Protection Force.

Background 
The Shura Council of Mujahideen in Derna was created by former Libyan Islamic Fighting Group member Salim Derby on 12 December 2014. The group frequently clashed with ISIL in Derna in disputes over power and resources in the city. In June 2015, ISIL gunmen killed senior Shura Council leader Nasser Akr. The group responded by declaring a Jihad against ISIL. Salim Derby was killed on 11 June 2015, As a result of the ensuing clashes.

The Shura Council was known to have close ties to the militant Egyptian al-Mourabitoun network of Hesham Ashmawy.

Members 
At its founding, the council included the following groups:
 Jaysh al-Islam (Libya)
 Abu Salim Martyrs Brigade

Further reading

References 

Jihadist groups in Libya
Rebel groups in Libya
Anti-ISIL factions
Second Libyan Civil War
Derna, Libya